Petre Andreanu (born 1 March 1917) was a Romanian equestrian. He competed in two events at the 1952 Summer Olympics.

References

External links

1917 births
Possibly living people
Romanian male equestrians
Olympic equestrians of Romania
Equestrians at the 1952 Summer Olympics
Place of birth missing (living people)